
Gmina Dobra is a rural gmina (administrative district) in Police County, West Pomeranian Voivodeship, in north-western Poland, on the German border.

Villages
Gmina Dobra contains the villages and settlements of Bezrzecze, Buk, Dobra, Dołuje, Grzepnica, Kościno, Łęgi, Mierzyn, Płochocin, Redlica, Rzędziny, Skarbimierzyce, Sławoszewo, Stolec, Wąwelnica and Wołczkowo.

Neighbouring gminas
Gmina Dobra is bordered by the city of Szczecin and by the gminas of Kołbaskowo and Police. It also borders Germany.

References
 Gminy Dobra
 Polish official population figures 2006

Dobra
Gmina Dobra